Mathieu Inthasane (born June 8, 1986 in Tours, France) is a football goalkeeper who currently plays for CFA 2 side Sézanne. He has previously played for Châteauroux, Stade Reims, where he made nine appearances in Ligue 2, Cassis Carnoux and Saint-Dizier.

See also
Football in France
List of football clubs in France

References

Mathieu Inthasane profile at Foot National

1986 births
Living people
French footballers
Association football goalkeepers
LB Châteauroux players
Stade de Reims players
SO Cassis Carnoux players
Ligue 2 players
CO Saint-Dizier players
Sportspeople from Tours, France
Footballers from Centre-Val de Loire